The 2014 IIHF World Women's U18 Championship Division I was a couple of international under-18 women ice hockey competitions organised by the International Ice Hockey Federation. The Division I "A" and Division I Qualification tournaments represent the second and the third tier of the IIHF World Women's U18 Championships.

Division I "A"
The 2014 Division I "A" tournament was played in Füssen, Germany, from 29 March to 4 April 2014.

Final standings

Results
All times are local (CET/CEST – UTC+01/UTC+02).

Division I Qualification
The 2014 Division I Qualification tournament was played in Krynica-Zdrój, Poland, from 18 to 23 March 2014. Team Poland marked the debut at this level.

Final standings

Results
All times are local (CET – UTC+01).

References

External links 
 IIHF.com

IIHF World Women's U18 Championship – Division I
World
International ice hockey competitions hosted by Poland
World
World
World
2014